Santini's Network (original title: La Rete di Santini) (2014) is a biographical film by German filmmaker Georg Brintrup on the life of Roman music collector Fortunato Santini (1777–1861) and how his famous private assembly of manuscript scores grew into the greatest music collection of the age.

Plot
The subject portrays an extraordinary story and a fascinating itinerary of survival through unusual episodes in the progress of culture.  When, at the turn of the eighteenth century, the Roman clergyman, Fortunato Santini, played by Italian actor Renato Scarpa,  discovers at the age of twenty his fervent passion for music, he decides to dedicate the rest of his life to collecting the manuscript scores of the great composers, either autographs in their own hand or scores written out by professional copyists. These manuscripts kept and preserved the heritage of musical works until their reproduction and publication as printed scores. Over the course of fifty years  his music collection swelled to 20,000 titles in 4,500 manuscripts and 1,200 printed copies, making it the most comprehensive collection of its kind anywhere. Santini's secret in preserving all these important works from the history of European music is the elaborate network of friends and acquaintances that he builds. Beginning in the libraries and among the cognoscenti of Italy, its reach extends throughout Europe, stretching from Rome to Vienna, from Paris to London, from Berlin to Moscow. Through his networking skills during his lifetime Santini became an international celebrity in the world of music 
Compositions of the first importance in music history, otherwise at risk of disappearing into oblivion, were rescued and preserved through his unremitting efforts.

The film deals not only with the inception and growth of Santini's precious collection, but also with its conservation after his death. In 1862 the collection was purchased and transported from Italy to the city of Münster in Germany and lay there forgotten for 40 years. Then in 1902 this trove was rediscovered and brought to the attention of the public through by the work of Edward Dent, the distinguished British musicologist. Subsequently, the collection was saved from firebombs during World War II , and though partially damaged after the war by a devastating flood, the irreplaceable musical opus of Santini has survived.

Cast
 Renato Scarpa: Fortunato Santini
 John Gayford: Edward Dent
 Maximilian Scheidt: Felix Mendelssohn
 Harald Redmer: Carl Friedrich Zelter
 Domenico Galasso: Giuseppe Baini
 Claudio Marchione: Giuseppe Jannacconi
 Pietro M. Beccatini: Carlo Odescalchi
 Antonio Giovannini: Mariano Astolfi
 Florian Steffens: young Edward Dent
 Emanuele Paragallo: young Fortunato Santini

Film music 
The Soundtrack is composed of musical pieces from Santini's collection, some performed for the first time under conductor Favio Colusso by the Ensemble Seicentonovecento.

Some other background music was composed by Flavio Colusso.

Release and reception
Santini’s Network premiered at the Auditorium of Santa Maria dell’Anima in Rome on 1 April 2014  and in Münster's  Schloßtheater on 9 April 2014. Film critic Günter Moseler: "A great film about a modest life for the future of Early Music." (Ein großer Film über ein kleines Leben für die Zukunft Alter Musik.). First broadcast was in Westdeutscher Rundfunk on 28 April 2014.

References

External links
 
 Presentation of the film
 Production note by "Filmwerkstatt" (film workshop) Münster

2014 films
Biographical films about musicians
German biographical drama films
Italian biographical drama films
2010s German-language films
2010s Italian-language films
2010s English-language films
English-language German films
English-language Italian films
Films about religion
Films set in the 19th century
Films shot in Italy
Films shot in Germany
Cultural depictions of classical musicians
Cultural depictions of Italian men
2010s biographical films
2010s German films